Villawood, a suburb of local government areas City of Canterbury-Bankstown and City of Fairfield, is 27 kilometres west of the Sydney central business district, in the state of New South Wales, Australia, and is a part of the Greater Western Sydney region.

History
The Aboriginal tribe of Gandangara once lived in the area. European settlement began in the early 1840s. During the 1860s, Villawood was used as pastoral land, but it was overrun with wild dogs. Woodville Road, which runs through Villawood, was once named Dog Trap Road because many farmers set dog traps for these wild dogs. A train station opened in 1922 to service the area was originally known as Woodville Road. Unfortunately, there was confusion with another place called Woodville in the Hunter Valley and thus the name was transposed into 'Villawood'.

The Villawood area is home to a large public housing estate constructed around the 1950s-1970s consisting of detached cottages, semi-detached townhouses, walk up apartments on Urana street, and formerly a Radburn design housing complex on the site of Thurina park, which became infamous for serious social issues, such as drugs and anti-social youth crime, even eventually breeding a gang called "the Bronx boys", dabbling in the drug trade and car-rebirthing before the eventual demolition of the complex in 1998.

Schools and churches
Villawood East Public School and Sacred Heart Primary School are located in the suburb. There are also day and community centres, several Christian churches and a Mosque conducts Islamic services in the old post office building on Woodville road at the shopping centre.

Commercial area
Villawood Place was once a major shopping centre, serving the surrounding areas. After nearby Bass Hill Plaza opened, many Villawood businesses went into decline, leaving a legacy of abandoned shop fronts and buildings, including the abandoned Franklins supermarket and large Australia Post office. There has been rejuvenation and renovation of Woodville (Villawood) Place since with construction of the new Aldi supermarket, Bunnings, a bakery, chemists, grocers and other shops. It is located in proximity to Villawood railway station. A business park in Villawood holds enterprises concerning hardware products, furniture, auto parts and second-hand goods. Leightonfield railway station services an industrial area in the eastern part of Villawood.

Vilawood now houses a variety of youth recreational and entertainment venues including AMF Bowling, Wiggles World, M9 Laser Skirmish, Sydney Indoor Climbing Gym, and Kartatak go-karting, and further recreational and food attractions are planned. These are all part of a complex called The Woods Action Centre, which is located on the northern side of the railway line, directly across the road from the station on the Villawood station exit which is opposite the shopping centre. For fast food, Villawood has KFC, McDonald's, Domino's, and Hungry Jack's.

Transport
Villawood railway station and Leightonfield railway station are on the Bankstown Line of the Sydney Trains network.

Sport and recreation
Apart from the Woods Action centre (see above) which includes Indoor Climbing, Ten-pin bowling, Go-karting and the Wiggles indoor play centre, Villawood is home to three other major sport and recreation areas: The Wran Leisure Centre, Thurina Park and Villawood Skatepark.

The Wran Leisure Centre (named after Neville Wran) houses a swimming pool, tennis courts, a gymnasium and squash courts.
Thurina Park houses two multi purpose sporting fields that cater for soccer, cricket and baseball. Thurina Park is also home to the Villawood United Soccer Club.

Population
Of these:
 The median age of Villawood residents was 36 years, compared to the national median of 35 years. Children aged 0–14 years made up 20.1% of the population (national average is 18.7%) and people aged 65 years and over made up 12.5% of the population (national average is 15.8%).
 There is a very diverse ethnic range.  Fewer than half (43.9%) of residents were born in Australia; the next most common countries of birth were Vietnam 13.8%, Lebanon 7.4%, China 2.6%, New Zealand 2.5% and Iraq 1.8%.  Looking past the country of birth to residents' self-identified ancestry shows another dimension of this cultural diversity: the most common ancestries were Lebanese 15.1%, Vietnamese 14.5%, Australian 10.8%, English 9.3% and Chinese 6.9%.  Less than one third (26.0%) of people spoke English at home; other languages spoken at home included Arabic 22.0%, Vietnamese 17.1%, Cantonese 3.6%, Mandarin 1.8%.
 The most common response for religion was Islam at 25.5%.

Detention centre

The suburb is home to Villawood Immigration Detention Centre, which is situated at 15 Birmingham Avenue. It was originally a hostel, constructed in 1949, to accommodate post-war refugees from Europe. In 1976, a subdivision of the original camp was converted into an immigration detention centre. In addition to housing asylum seekers, people refused entry into the country at international airports and seaports may also be detained in the centre.

The centre has been the focus of much controversy, with accusations of human rights abuses. In January 2008, the Human Rights and Equal Opportunity Commission (HREOC) said the high-security section of Villawood Detention Centre was the "most prison like" of all Australia's immigration detention centres, and demanded it be closed immediately.

See also 

 Radburn design housing

References

External links

 The Fairfield City Council Website
 Bankstown City Council Community Profile

Suburbs of Sydney
City of Canterbury-Bankstown
Hume Highway
City of Fairfield